Ivan Vykhristyuk (born 29 January 1929) was a Soviet wrestler. He competed in the men's freestyle heavyweight at the 1956 Summer Olympics.

References

External links
 

1929 births
Possibly living people
Soviet male sport wrestlers
Olympic wrestlers of the Soviet Union
Wrestlers at the 1956 Summer Olympics
Place of birth missing